Mario Bergamaschi (7 January 1929 – 18 January 2020) was an Italian footballer who played as a midfielder.

At club level, he played for 14 seasons (392 games, 7 goals) in Serie A for Calcio Como, A.C. Milan and U.C. Sampdoria.

At international level, he made his debut for the Italy national football team on 5 December 1954 in a game against Argentina.

He stated that during the championship 1957 season he used to take doping that the players called "centimeter", from the markings on the syringe.

At the time of his death, he was the last living person to have appeared for Milan in the 1958 European Cup Final, as well as one of two living people born in the 1920s to have played for Milan, with the other being Lorenzo Buffon.

Honours
Milan
 Serie A champion: 1954–55, 1956–57.
 Latin Cup winner: 1956.

External links

References

1929 births
2020 deaths
Italian footballers
Italy international footballers
Serie A players
Como 1907 players
A.C. Milan players
U.C. Sampdoria players
Association football midfielders